Swords of Twilight is a 1989 video game developed by Free Fall Associates and published by Electronic Arts for the Amiga.

Gameplay
Swords of Twilight is a game in which each role-playing game character can perform simultaneous action, dialogue and travel.

Reception
Douglas Seacat reviewed the game for Computer Gaming World, and stated that "the game wins my vote for CRPG of the year. One simply cannot recommend this game highly enough."

Reviews
Amiga Computing - Jan, 1990
Amiga Action - Jan, 1991
ASM (Aktueller Software Markt) - Nov, 1989
The Games Machine - Jan, 1990
Amiga Format - Jan, 1990
Amiga User International - Dec, 1989
Amiga World - Feb, 1990

References

External links

Swords of Twilight at the Hall of Light
Review in Info

1989 video games
Action role-playing video games
Amiga games
Amiga-only games
Cooperative video games
Electronic Arts games
Fantasy video games
Video games developed in the United States